was a Japanese politician whom served in the House of Representative from 1967 until his death in 2001. From 1981 to 1982, Ito was the Director General of the Japan Defense Agency.

Born in Miyagi Prefecture in 1924, he studied law at Tohoku University and served briefly as a second lieutenant in the Imperial Japanese Army.

References

1924 births
2001 deaths
Japanese defense ministers
Government ministers of Japan
Members of the House of Representatives (Japan)
Liberal Democratic Party (Japan) politicians
Imperial Japanese Army personnel of World War II
Imperial Japanese Army officers